Ramanlal Gokaldas Saraiya was an Indian educationist and a former president of Sarvajanik Education Society, Surat, a philanthropic society which manages several educational institutions including Sarvajanik College of Engineering and Technology. The Government of India awarded him Padma Bhushan, the third highest Indian civilian award, in 1963.

References

Recipients of the Padma Bhushan in medicine
20th-century Indian educational theorists
Year of birth missing
Year of death missing